Mount Soma is a 435-acre Vedic Vastu community in the Blue Ridge Mountains of North Carolina established in 2011.

Description
The Mount Soma center includes a visitor's center, a meditation hall and the Vedic Sri Somesvara Temple. The temple was built using 46 tons of hand-carved Indian granite and Vastu architecture. The temple grounds include hand-carved black granite Navagrahas (nine planets) and a 20-foot statue of Lord Hanuman.

References

External links
 Official website

Asian-American culture in North Carolina
Hindu temples in the United States
Indian-American culture
Populated places in North Carolina
2011 establishments in North Carolina
Buildings and structures in Buncombe County, North Carolina
Religious buildings and structures in North Carolina
Hinduism in the United States
Indian-American culture in North Carolina
Soma (drink)